Thai-Son Kwiatkowski (born February 13, 1995) is a Vietnamese American tennis player. He played collegiately for the Virginia Cavaliers. On May 29, 2017, Kwiatkowski won the NCAA Men's Singles Championship. This victory earned him a wildcard into the main draw of the 2017 US Open.

College career
Coming out of high school, he was the nation's top recruit. Kwiatkowski was on three national championship teams during his time at Virginia. As a sophomore, he tied the school's single season wins record, going 44-8 during the season. On September 11, 2016, Kwiatkowski won the American Collegiate Invitational, which earned him a wild card into the qualifying tournament for the 2017 US Open. After his senior season, he was named first-team all-ACC. Kwiatkowski won the singles title at the 2017 NCAA Men's Singles Championship, defeating William Blumberg in the final.
Other notable college achievements: 
• 2018 NCAA Top 10 Award winner
• ACC Men’s Tennis Scholar-Athlete of the Year (second straight year)
• Was also named the Virginia Athletic Department’s Scholar Athlete of the Year for the second straight year
• Singles All-American, his third time earning the honor
• All-ACC First Team, his fourth all-conference honor but his first time being voted to the first team
• ITA Atlantic Region Senior Player of the Year
• NCAA All-Tournament Team at No. 2 Doubles
• ITA Indoors All-Tournament Team (No. 2 Singles and No. 2 Doubles)
• ITA Scholar-Athlete
• Repeated as the VaSID State Player of the Year
• Four time member of the All-ACC Academic Team
• ACC Player of the Week (April 18)

Professional career

After winning the NCAA singles championship, Kwiatkowski was awarded a wildcard into the main draw of the 2017 US Open. He faced the 23rd seed Mischa Zverev in the first round, losing in five sets.

He won his maiden Challenger title in Newport Beach in 2020.
He was also awarded a wildcard into the main draw of the 2020 US Open, where he lost in the first round to Kwon Soon-woo in four sets.

Personal life
Thai-Son's parents are Wendi Le and Tim Kwiatkowski. He has a younger brother named Liem-Son. His parents are both University of Virginia alumni. Kwiatkowski is of Vietnamese and Polish descent. Kwiatkowski majored in commerce.

On 23 February 2021, Thai-Son Kwiatkowski successfully obtained Vietnamese citizenship in order to play for Vietnam's national tennis team in upcoming tournaments. He immediately became the most accomplished tennis player to represent Vietnam after he obtained the citizenship and planned to represent the country in international competition. He is playing for Hung Thinh - Ho Chi Minh City team since October 2019.

Thai-Son is not the first foreign-born tennis player to be recruited by a domestic tennis team. Daniel Nguyen a Vietnamese American tennis player is playing for the Hai Dang - Tay Ninh team and obtained Vietnamese citizenship in 2019.

Challenger and Futures finals

Singles: 5 (5–0)

Doubles: 12 (5–7)

References

External links
 
 
 Virginia Cavaliers bio

1995 births
Living people
American male tennis players
Virginia Cavaliers men's tennis players
Sportspeople from Charlotte, North Carolina
American sportspeople of Vietnamese descent
American people of Polish descent
Sportspeople of Vietnamese descent
Tennis people from North Carolina